Pseudosimnia nudelmani is a species of sea snail, a marine gastropod mollusk in the family Ovulidae, the ovulids, cowry allies or false cowries.

Description
The length of the shell attains 8.3 mm.

Distribution
The marine species occurs in the Indian Ocean off Réunion.

References

 
Lorenz F. & Fehse D. (2009) The living Ovulidae. A manual of the families of allied cowries: Ovulidae, Pediculariidae and Eocypraeidae. Hackenheim: Conchbooks.

Ovulidae
Gastropods described in 2009